Caloptilia euhelia is a moth of the family Gracillariidae. It is known from Papua New Guinea.

References

euhelia
Moths described in 1955
Moths of Asia